Herne railway station may refer to:

 Herne station, in Germany
 Herne railway station (Belgium), in Belgium

See also
 Herne Hill railway station, in the London Borough of Lambeth, South London
 Heren railway station, Taiwan